The Oakland Athletics are a Major League Baseball (MLB) team based in Oakland, California. They play in the American League West division. The club was founded in Philadelphia in 1901, moved to Kansas City, Missouri in 1955 and relocated to Oakland in 1968. The first game of the new baseball season for a team is played on Opening Day, and being named the Opening Day starter is an honor, which is often given to the player who is expected to lead the pitching staff that season, though there are various strategic reasons why a team's best pitcher might not start on Opening Day.
 
Since their arrival in Oakland, the A's home field has been the Oakland–Alameda County Coliseum, a multi-purpose stadium that has also been used for football, and soccer games. Commonly referred to as The Oakland Coliseum, or simply The Coliseum, it was formerly known as Oakland–Alameda County Coliseum (1966–1998, Present), Network Associates Coliseum (1998–2004) and McAfee Coliseum (2004–2008). The A's played their 1996 Opening Day game at Cashman Field in Las Vegas, Nevada while repairs at the Oakland–Alameda County Coliseum were being completed, the first time in 39 years that a major league team played in a minor-league ballpark.

In Oakland, the A's have used 32 different Opening Day starting pitchers in their 52 seasons. The 32 starters have a combined Opening Day record of 16 wins, 19 losses and 17 no decisions. No decisions are only awarded to the starting pitcher if the game is won or lost after the starting pitcher has left the game or if the starting pitcher pitches fewer than five innings. Of the 17 no decisions, the A's went on to win seven and lose ten of those games, for a team record on Opening Day of 23 wins and 29 losses.

Since it moved to Oakland, the team has played 36 of their Opening Day games at home: 33 at the Oakland–Alameda County Coliseum, 3 in Tokyo, and once in Las Vegas. Of the 33 games played in Oakland, the A's starting pitchers have a record of 12 wins, 9 losses and 12 no decisions (the team won seven and lost six of these no decisions). The 1996 game at Las Vegas' Cashman Field was a loss for starter Carlos Reyes. The 2008 game in the Tokyo Dome was a no decision for starter Joe Blanton that ended in an A's loss. The 2012 Tokyo Dome game resulted in a no decision for starter Brandon McCarthy and a loss for the team. Mike Fiers took the loss in the 2019 Tokyo Dome opener. Overall, the team's starting pitchers' record in home games is 12–11 (with 14 no decisions).

The A's have advanced to the playoffs 18 times while in Oakland, winning the American League Championship Series six times and going on to win the World Series in 1972, 1973, 1974 and 1989. In the 18 seasons that the A's advanced to the playoffs, the team's Opening Day starting pitchers have had a record of eight wins, four losses and six no decisions; the team ultimately won three and lost three of the no decisions. The team's starters won four and lost one Opening Day game in the six seasons they advanced to the World Series.

Catfish Hunter was the team's first Opening Day starter after the team moved to Oakland, taking a 3–1 loss to the Baltimore Orioles at Memorial Stadium in 1968.

Key

Opening Day results

Notes

Pitchers
Opening Day starting pitchers listed in descending order by the number of Opening Day starts for the A's in Oakland:

Footnotes 
 Catfish Hunter also had one Opening Day start for the Kansas City Athletics in 1966, giving him a total of four Opening Day starts with the franchise. Hunter got the loss in his Opening Day start in 1966.

References 

Opening Day starting pitchers
Lists of Major League Baseball Opening Day starting pitchers